Jackson Township is one of thirteen townships in Owen County, Indiana, United States. As of the 2010 census, its population was 1,735 and it contained 1,024 housing units.

Geography

Unincorporated towns
 Cunot at 
(This list is based on USGS data and may include former settlements.)

Lakes
 Barnes Lake
 Cataract Lake

Landmarks
 Richard Lieber State Park

School districts
 Cloverdale Community Schools

Political districts
 State House District 46
 State Senate District 37

References
 
 United States Census Bureau 2009 TIGER/Line Shapefiles
 IndianaMap

External links
 Indiana Township Association
 United Township Association of Indiana
 City-Data.com page for Jackson Township

Townships in Owen County, Indiana
Townships in Indiana